William Spalding may refer to:

William de Spalding (before 1300 – after 1321), accidentally killed a man whilst playing medieval football in 1321
William Spalding (MP) (before 1355 – after 1400), represented Southwark (UK Parliament constituency)
William Spalding (writer) (1809–1859), Scottish author and educator

See also
William Spaulding (disambiguation)
Spalding (disambiguation)